Kalabha Kadhalan is a 2006 Indian Tamil-language romantic thriller film directed by debutant Igore, starring Arya, Renuka Menon, and Akshaya. This film was a low-budget production, and the soundtrack was composed by Niru. It enjoyed relatively quiet success. It shared a similar storyline to S. J. Suryah’s Vaali and another 2006 film called Uyir. The film released on 17 February 2006.

Plot 
An IT manager named Akhilan (Arya) and a Tirunelveli girl named Anbarasi (Renuka Menon) are a newly married couple. They shift to their new house in Chennai and begin to live a happy life, even though their marriage was not love-based at first.

Soon, Anbarasi's family comes to visit them, and they leave Anbarasi's stepsister Kanmani (Akshaya), as she wants to pursue her post-graduate studies in multimedia. As Kanmani stays with Anbarasi and Akhilan in the same house, she begins to develop feelings for Akhilan, even though he is her brother-in-law. Kanmani continues to dream of romancing with Akhilan whenever Anbarasi is not around.

Akhilan does not want to hurt his beloved wife, who becomes pregnant and has given birth to their son. Tired of dodging Kanmani for almost a year, he seeks advice from a psychiatrist on how to solve his problem. The psychiatrist tells him to try and marry Kanmani off to anyone else. Akhilan secretly comes to Kanmani's village and requests Kanmani's male cousin to pursue and marry her. Following Akhilan's advice, Kanmani's cousin decides to marry Kanmani, but she rejects him constantly. After about a month, Kanmani's cousin kidnaps her, rapes her, and leaves her at Akhilan's apartment. This shocks everyone in the family, especially Akhilan. He admits secretly to Kanmani about his action and also told that the raping plan was not his advice. The whole family forces Kanmani to marry her cousin, because of the shame of rape being taboo. The marriage takes place, and Kanmani's family leaves to Thirunelveli.

The next morning, Kanmani commits suicide and dies. Akhilan, Anbarasi, and their child go back to Kanmani's village. Anbarasi's aunt hits Kanmani's husband as she thinks that it was because of him Kanmani died. Akhilan, standing right beside him, is all over guilty because it was he who planned all this to avoid Kanmani disturbing his married life. The film ends with the note “Good love, bad love, what is there in love?”

Cast
Arya as Akhilan
Renuka Menon as Anbarasi
Akshaya as Kanmani
Pawan as Dhana
Gvanantham as Anbarasi's brother
Ilavarasu
Nizhalgal Ravi
Vanitha Krishnachandran

Production
The film, produced by Vishnu Talkies, is scripted and directed by Iger, who has directed some commercials and worked with directors like Velu Prabhakaran, Narayanamurthy and Nanda Periyasami. The film has been shot at locations in Chennai, Nagercoil, Tenkasi, Kutralam and Mahabalipuram.

The film introduces a new music director in Iru, who is based in France and has released many Tamil music albums there. Wielding the camera is R Mathi, with art-work by Milan, and dialogue penned by Balakumaran.

Critical reception
Nowrunning wrote: "Kalaba Kadhalan explores relationships, marriage, romance and sex. Importantly, this lurid subject matter is handled subtly where no one gender being offended. Debutant director Igor has made this movie honestly, convincingly and believably. The plot, details, characterization and dialogue are good". Thiraipadam wrote:"The most surprising thing about Kalaaba Kaadhalan is how boring it is, a poorly-paced screenplay and a weak climax make the film a surprisingly sedate affair".
Indiaglitz wrote: "Igor shows a skill for handling a difficult subject. He traverses the tightrope of seduction and vulgarity quite nicely. Something you don't expect a debutant to do. On the whole, Kalaba Kadhalan is watchable despite some glitches."

Soundtrack
Music was composed by newcomer Niru. The soundtrack contains five songs. The audio launch was held on December 12, 2005, at the Satyam complex. The audio was launched by Vikram and received by SJ. Suryah. Producer Council President Mr. Thiagarajan also took part in the function. Along with them the film's hero Arya, director Ighor, producer Nandagopal and many other dignitaries took part in the event. Two songs were screened during the release.

 "Chellame Idhu" - Karthik, Neuer, Sunitha Sarathy
 "Pattuselai" - Krishnaraj, Sriram, Nithyasree
 "Manmeethu Aangal" - Haricharan, Evra
 "Thogai Virithu" - Chinmayee
 "Urugudhe" - Andrea Jeremiah

References

External links
 
 

2006 films
2000s Tamil-language films
2000s romantic thriller films
Indian romantic thriller films